Fabio Franceschini (born 8 May 1988) is a former Italian footballer.

Biography
Born in Copparo, the Province of Ferrara, Emilia region, Franceschini started his career at Ferrara team SPAL. he left for U.S. Lecce in temporary deal along with Bidre'ce Azor in July 2004. In the end of season Franceschini was signed by Lecce outright and Azor became a free agent after the bankruptcy of SPAL SpA and joined Sampdoria. Franceschini was the member of the reserve from 2005 to 2008. In 2008 Franceschini left for Giacomense. He played 32 games in the fourth division.

International career
Franceschini was included in the preliminary 23-men squad for 2005 UEFA European Under-17 Football Championship, but was not included in the final 18-men squad. He also included in the 20-man squad for 2005 FIFA U-17 World Championship as an unused substitute.

Franceschini played twice for Italy national under-19 football team in October 2006.

References

External links
 FIGC 
 Football.it Profile 

Italian footballers
U.S. Lecce players
A.C. Giacomense players
Association football defenders
Sportspeople from the Province of Ferrara
1988 births
Living people
Footballers from Emilia-Romagna